The 2005 Devon County Council election was an election to Devon County Council which took place on 5 May 2005 as part of the 2005 United Kingdom local elections. 62 councillors were elected from various electoral divisions, which returned either one or two county councillors each by first-past-the-post voting for a four-year term of office. The electoral divisions had been redrawn since the last election in 2001. No elections were held in Plymouth and Torbay, which are unitary authorities outside the area covered by the County Council.

All locally registered electors (British, Irish, Commonwealth and European Union citizens) who were aged 18 or over on election day were entitled to vote in the local elections.

Summary
The election saw the Liberal Democrats regain control of the council, which had last been under Liberal Democrat control after the 1997 election, but had been under no overall control since the 2001 election. The Conservative Party gained only one seat, despite the increase in the number of seats from 54 to 62 after redistricting, becoming the second-largest party on the council and therefore the official opposition party. The Liberal Party lost all three of its seats in the election, while the Independent grouping lost one seat. The Gallagher index for the election, which measures the disproportionality of seat allocation, was 11.94.

Results

Electoral division results

Notes

References

2005 English local elections
2005
2000s in Devon